Mount Carmel Central School is a CBSE affiliated school, situated at Maryhill in Mangalore city of Karnataka in India.

Facilities and amenities 
The facilities and amenities provided by this school are
 Physics Lab
 Chemistry Lab
 Biology Lab
 Counselling
 Sports Facilities
 Scouts and Guides
 Karate classes
 Music classes
 Drawing classes
 Arts/craft classes

References

Schools in Mangalore
Schools in Dakshina Kannada district
Schools in Karnataka
Christian schools in Karnataka
High schools and secondary schools in Karnataka
Catholic secondary schools in India